Abergowrie is a rural town and locality in the Shire of Hinchinbrook, Queensland, Australia.

Geography
The town is located near the confluence of the Herbert River and Gowrie Creek.

Abergowrie has the following mountains:

 Boulder Hill 
 Duncan Bluff 
 Mount Cadillah 
 Mount Echo 
 Mount Graham 
 Mount Westminster Abbey 
 Slopeaway

History
Gugu Badhun (also known as Koko-Badun and Kokopatun) is an Australian Aboriginal language of North Queensland. The language region includes areas within the local government area of Charters Towers Region, particularly the localities of Greenvale and the Valley of Lagoons, and in the Upper Burdekin River area and in Abergowrie.
The town is named after the Abergowrie property, selected by James Atkinson in 1883. He coined the name from the Celtic word aber (confluence) and gowrie for Gowrie Creek, reflecting the location.

On Sunday 22 October 1933, Bishop McGuire laid the foundation stone for a Catholic agricultural farm school. Boys would be able to take a 2-year course that would prepare them to be farmers. In January 1934, Reverend Brother William Benedict Doran was appointed principal of the college; he had trained in agriculture at the Gatton Agricultural College, the Hawkesbury Agricultural College, and the Lismore Agricultural College. The college opened to students on 1 March 1934. St Teresa's Agricultural College was officially opened the Apostolic Delegate, Filippo Bernardini. It was operated by the Christian Brothers. It is now known as St Theresa's College.

In 1946, a Royal Commission was established to investigate soldier settlement schemes for soldiers returning from World War II. Abergowrie was chosen as a site where 300 farms could be established with sugarcane being the likely crop. It was also proposed that a sugar mill be established , but instead a cane tramway was built to transport the harvested sugarcane from Abergowrie to the Victoria sugar mill near Ingham.

Abergowrie Post Office opened on 1 May 1953 and closed in 1974.

Abergowrie State School opened on 23 February 1953.

Education
Abergowrie State School is a government primary (Prep-6) school for boys and girls at 5 Venables Road. In 2017, the school had an enrolment of 4 students with 2 teachers (1 full-time equivalent) and 5 non-teaching staff (2 full-time equivalent). In 2018, the school had an enrolment of 8 students with 2 teachers (1 full-time equivalent) and 5 non-teaching staff (2 full-time equivalent).

St Teresa's College is a Catholic secondary (7-12) school for boys at 3819 Abergowrie Road. In 2017, the school had an enrolment of 201 students with 36 teachers (34 full-time equivalent) and 31 non-teaching staff (25 full-time equivalent). In 2018, the school had an enrolment of 190 students with 35 teachers (34 full-time equivalent) and 34 non-teaching staff (30 full-time equivalent).

There is no government secondary school in Abergowrie. The nearest government secondary school is Ingham State High School in Ingham to the south-east.

Community groups 
The Abergowrie-Long Pocket branch of the Queensland Country Women's Association meets at 2346 Abergowrie Road, Long Pocket.

References

External links

 
 Town map of Abergowrie, 1977

Shire of Hinchinbrook
Towns in Queensland
Localities in Queensland